Tesam Pongte is an Indian politician of the BJP in Arunachal Pradesh.
He is the member of the Arunachal Pradesh Legislative Assembly of 53 Changlang North (Arunachal Pradesh) constituency.

See also
Arunachal Pradesh Legislative Assembly

References

Bharatiya Janata Party politicians from Arunachal Pradesh
Arunachal Pradesh MLAs 2019–2024
Living people
People from Changlang district
Arunachal Pradesh MLAs 2014–2019
Year of birth missing (living people)
Deputy Speakers of the Arunachal Pradesh Legislative Assembly
Naga people